The John Colahan Griffin Nature Reserve is a 96 ha conservation reserve in north-central Victoria, south-eastern Australia.  It lies 185 km north-west of Melbourne.  It was acquired in 2011 by Bush Heritage Australia as a result of a legacy from John Colahan Griffin.

Description
The reserve lies between St Arnaud Range National Park and Dalyenong Nature Conservation Reserve.  It contains old-growth eucalypt woodland, including long-leaved box and yellow gum trees, some of which are very large and likely to be over 300 years old.

Flora and fauna
Vegetation communities represented are grassy woodland, heathy dry forest, box-ironbark forest and alluvial terraces herb-rich woodland.  Nationally endangered red cross and Stuart Mill spider orchids are present.  Animals recorded from the reserve include swift parrots, brown treecreepers, crested bellbirds, painted and black-chinned honeyeaters, fat-tailed dunnarts, lace monitors and woodland blind snakes.

References

External links
 Bush Heritage Australia

Bush Heritage Australia reserves
Nature reserves in Victoria (Australia)
2011 establishments in Australia